William G. Worley was the Republican President of the West Virginia Senate from Preston County and served from 1895 to 1897.

Born and raised in Monongalia County, West Virginia, Worley practiced law in that county prior to his election to the state senate, and resumed the practice of law after his political service ended. A Republican, Worley continued to support the party's political efforts after leaving government.

References

Republican Party West Virginia state senators
Presidents of the West Virginia State Senate
Year of death missing
Year of birth missing